The 2018 Gibraltar Open (officially the 2018 ManBetX Gibraltar Open) was a professional ranking snooker tournament that took place from 7 to 11 March 2018 at the Tercentenary Sports Hall in Gibraltar. It was the seventeenth ranking event of the 2017/2018 season.

Shaun Murphy was the defending champion, but due to back and neck problems he withdrew prior to the tournament.

Ryan Day captured his second career ranking title, both won in the 2017/2018 season. He did so with a 4–0 win in the final against Cao Yupeng.

Prize fund
The breakdown of prize money for this year is shown below:

 Winner: £25,000
 Runner-up: £12,000
 Semi-final: £6,000
 Quarter-final: £4,000
 Last 16: £3,000
 Last 32: £2,000
 Last 64: £1,000

 Total: £153,000

The "rolling 147 prize" for a maximum break stood at £25,000

Main draw

Top half

Section 1

Section 2

Section 3

Section 4

Bottom half

Section 5

Section 6

Section 7

Section 8

Finals

Final

Amateur pre-qualifying
These matches were played in Gibraltar on 7–8 March 2018. All matches were best of 7 frames.

Round 1

Round 2

Round 3

Century breaks

Main rounds centuries
Total: 35

 140, 130  Stuart Bingham
 140  Scott Donaldson
 140  Anthony McGill
 135, 107  Kyren Wilson
 134  Martin O'Donnell
 130  Li Hang
 130  Jack Lisowski
 128  Jackson Page
 123  Cao Yupeng
 123  Mike Finn
 122, 113, 105  Joe Perry
 121  Jamie O'Neill
 118  Dominic Dale
 115, 100  Liang Wenbo
 112, 104  Jamie Cope
 112  Hammad Miah
 112  Gary Wilson
 111, 107, 104, 100  Ryan Day
 110  Jamie Jones
 109, 107  Zhang Anda
 108  Tian Pengfei
 104  Michael Georgiou
 104  Craig Steadman
 100  Oliver Brown
 100  Zhao Xintong

Qualifying rounds centuries
Total: 5

 125  James Cahill
 124  Ian Martin
 114  Steven Hallworth
 114  Saqib Nasir
 104  Joe O'Connor

References

2018
2018 in snooker
2018 in Gibraltarian sport
March 2018 sports events in Europe